Balta Doamnei is a commune in Prahova County, Muntenia, Romania. It is composed of four villages: Balta Doamnei, Bâra, Curcubeu, and Lacu Turcului.

The commune lies in the Wallachian Plain, on the left bank of the Ialomița River. It is located in the southern part of Prahova County, on the border with Ilfov County.

Natives
 Stelian Popescu (1874–1954), journalist

References

Balta Doamnei
Localities in Muntenia